Raja Parba, also known as Mithuna Sankranti, is a three-day-long festival of womanhood celebrated in Odisha, India. The second day of the festival signifies beginning of the solar month of Mithuna from, which the season of rains starts.

Mythology 

It is believed that the mother Goddess Earth or the divine wife of Lord Vishnu undergoes menstruation during the first three days. The fourth day is called Vasumati Snana, or ceremonial bath of Bhudevi. The term Raja came from the Sanskrit word 'Rajas' which means menstruation and when a woman menstruates, she is called 'Rajaswala' or a menstruating woman, and in medieval times the festival became more popular as an agricultural holiday marking the worship of Bhudevi, who is the wife of lord Jagannath.
A silver idol of Bhudevi is still to be found in the Puri Temple beside Lord Jagannath .

Rajaparba
It falls in mid June, the first day is called Pahili Raja,
second day is Mithuna Sankranti, third day is Bhudaaha or Basi Raja.
The final fourth day is called Basumati snana,
in which the ladies bath the grinding stone as a symbol of Bhumi with turmeric paste and adore with flower, sindoor etc. All type of seasonal fruits are offered to mother Bhumi.
The day before first day is called Sajabaja or preparatory day during which the house, kitchen including grinding stones are cleaned, spices are ground for three days. During these three days women and girls take rest from work and wear new Saree, Alata, and ornaments. It is similar to Ambubachi Mela.
The most popular among numerous festivals in Odisha, Raja is celebrated for three consecutive days. Just as the earth prepares itself to quench its thirst by the incoming rain the unmarried girls of the family are groomed for impending matrimony through this festival. They pass these three days in joyous festivity and observe customs like eating only uncooked and nourishing food especially Podapitha, do not take bath or take salt, do not walk barefoot and vow to give birth to healthy children in future. The most vivid and enjoyable memories one has of the Raja gaiety is the rope-swings on big banyan trees and the lyrical folk-songs that one listens from the nubile beauty enjoying the atmosphere.

To celebrate the advent of monsoon, the joyous festival is arranged for three days by the villagers. Though celebrated all over the state it is more enthusiastically observed in all over the Odisha but celebrated with much fervour across the coastal districts. The first day is called "Pahili Raja", second is "Raja Sankranti"  and third is "Bhumi Dahana or Basi Raja".

According to popular belief as women menstruate, which is a sign of fertility, so also Mother Earth menstruates. So all three days of the festival are considered to be the menstruating period of Mother Earth. During the festival all agricultural operations remain suspended. As a mark of respect towards the Earth during her menstruation days, all agricultural works comes to a standstill during these days. Significantly, it is a festival of the unmarried girls, the potential mothers. They all observe the restrictions prescribed for a menstruating woman. The very first day, they rise before dawn, do their hair, anoint their bodies with turmeric paste and oil and then take the purificatory bath in a river or tank. Peculiarly, bathing for the rest two days is prohibited. They don't walk bare-foot do not scratch the earth, do not grind, do not tear anything apart, do not cut and do not cook. During all the three consecutive days, they are seen in the best of dresses and decorations, eating cakes and rich food at the houses of friends and relatives, spending long cheery hours, moving up and down on improvised swings, rending the village sky with their merry impromptu songs.

The swings are of different varieties, such as 'Ram Doli', 'Charki Doli', 'Pata Doli', 'Dandi Doli' etc. Songs specially meant for the festival speak of love, affection, respect, social behaviour and everything of social order that comes to the minds of the singers. Through anonymous and composed extempore, much of these songs, through sheer beauty of diction and sentiment, has earned permanence and has gone to make the very substratum of Odisha's folk-poetry. While girls thus scatter beauty, grace and music all around, moving up and down on the swings during the festival, young men give themselves to strenuous games and good food, on the eve of the onset of the monsoons, which will not give them even a minute's respite for practically four months making them one with mud, slush and relentless showers, their spirits keep high with only the hopes of a good harvest. As all agricultural activities remain suspended and a joyous atmosphere pervades, the young men of the village keep themselves busy in various types of country games, the most favourite being 'Kabadi'. Competitions are also held between different groups of villages. All nights 'Jatra' performances or 'Gotipua' dances are arranged in prosperous villages where they can afford the professional groups. Enthusiastic amateurs also arrange plays and other kinds of entertainment.

See also
 Ambubachi Mela
 Jagannath
 Keddaso
 Odia language
 Odia literature
 Salepur
 Sisua village
 Teej

References

External links 

Festivals in Odisha
June observances
Hindu festivals
Religious festivals in India